The 1999 Honda Grand Prix of Monterey was the seventeenth round of the 1999 CART World Series season, held on September 12, 1999, at the Mazda Raceway Laguna Seca in Monterey, California. The event was marred when driver Gonzalo Rodríguez died after he was in a practice crash.

The race's winner was American driver Bryan Herta which made 7 career Poles (and of which was his last). This was Herta's 2nd and final victory in CART.  Adrian Fernandez broke his wrist during the race but still managed to finish in 5th place.

Race

References

1999 in CART
CART
Champ Car seasons
Monterey, California